Lee Gordon Demarbre (born 8 March 1972) is a Canadian cult film maker. As the president and key person in the Ottawa, Ontario based Odessa Filmworks production company, he has led the creation of several internationally shown films such as Harry Knuckles and the Pearl Necklace and Jesus Christ Vampire Hunter.

Born  in Chicoutimi, Quebec, Demarbre graduated from St Matthew Catholic High School in Orleans, Ontario in 1990 then graduated from  Carleton University's film studies programme. In 1998, his short film trailer martial arts movie spoof Harry Knuckles garnered attention and led to longer form versions featuring the Harry Knuckles character. This led to a debut full-length feature film, Jesus Christ Vampire Hunter which featured many of the actors from the earlier Harry Knuckles films.

Prior to his full-time commitment with Odessa, Demarbre worked for Ottawa's ByTowne Cinema. He programs films for another Ottawa cinema, the Mayfair Theatre.

In January 2007, Demarbre directed Odessa's project The Dead Sleep Easy, filmed on location in Mexico and starring Ian Hodgkinson. His movie Smash Cut was released in 2009 after post-production from July 2008.

He is also the host of the weekly Ottawa film talk radio program Drunken Master Revue on CKCU-FM. He also presents "Saturday Night Sinema", which is a monthly showcase of rare or classic cult film prints at the Mayfair Theatre.

Filmography
Jesus Christ Vampire Hunter (2001)
Harry Knuckles and the Treasure of the Aztec Mummy (2002)
Harry Knuckles and the Pearl Necklace (2004)
Bzzzzzzzz (2005)
The Dead Sleep Easy (2007)
Vampiro: Angel, Devil, Hero (2008)
Smash Cut (2009)
Stripped Naked (2009)
Summer's Moon (2009)
Enter the Drag Dragon (2023)

References

Further reading
  Profile of Demarbre as he was promoting Harry Knuckles and the Treasure of the Aztec Mummy at the Cannes Film Festival.
  Further coverage of Demarbre and his film at Cannes.
  Profile of Demarbre and the release of his film, Harry Knuckles and the Pearl Necklace.

External links
 Ottawa XPress: Film - Harry Knuckles and the Pearl Necklace
 Slamdance Festival: Lee Demarbre profile
 

1972 births
Living people
Film directors from Quebec
French Quebecers
Film producers from Quebec
Canadian radio personalities
Carleton University alumni
People from Saguenay, Quebec
Horror film directors